The  was the last biplane fighter used by the Imperial Japanese Army, entering service in 1935. Built by Kawasaki Kōkūki Kōgyō K.K. for the Imperial Japanese Army, it saw combat service in Manchukuo and in North China during the early stages of the Second Sino-Japanese War. Its reporting name given by the Allies was "Perry".

Design and development
The Ki-10 was designed by Japanese aeronautical engineer Takeo Doi, who had succeeded Richard Vogt as chief designer for Kawasaki. The design was in response to a requirement issued by the Imperial Japanese Army for a new fighter, and was the winner of a competition against Nakajima's Ki-11. Although the low-wing monoplane offered by Nakajima was more advanced, the Army preferred the more maneuverable biplane offered by Kawasaki. In order to overcome the speed disadvantage the Kawasaki team used a metal three-blade propeller in the third prototype, while flush-head rivets were used in an attempt to reduce drag.

The Kawasaki design had unequal-span biplane wings, braced by struts, and with upper-wing ailerons. The structure was of all-metal construction, which was then fabric-covered. Armament consisted of two 7.7 mm (.303 in) Type 89 machine guns, synchronized to fire through the propeller. The initial production version was powered by a liquid-cooled  Kawasaki Ha9-IIa V-12.

Operations
The Ki-10 was deployed in Manchukuo (Manchuria) and in the initial campaigns of the Second Sino-Japanese War in northern China.

On September 21, 1937, Major Hiroshi Miwa, formerly hired as a military flight instructor for Zhang Xueliang's Fengtian Army air corps and well known in the Chinese military aviation circles of the time, commanded a flight of 7 Ki-10 fighters of the 1st Daitai-16th Hiko Rentai, on an escort of 14 Mitsubishi Ki-2 bombers to attack the city of Taiyuan where they encountered Chinese air force V-65C Corsairs and Curtiss Hawk IIs, shooting down a few, but Major Miwa himself was shot down and fatally wounded by Captain Chan Kee-Wong, commander of the 28th Pursuit Squadron of the 5th Pursuit Group flying a Curtiss Hawk.

By the time of the Nomonhan Incident (Battles of Khalkhin Gol) in 1939, the Ki-10 had become largely obsolete, and was being superseded by the Nakajima Ki-27.

At the beginning of the Pacific War, the Ki-10 was retired to training and secondary missions, but later returned to front-line service, performing short-range patrol and reconnaissance missions in Japan proper and China in January–February 1942.

Variants

data from Japanese Aircraft of the Pacific War
 Ki-10 : Prototype for Imperial Japanese Army Air Force (4 built in early 1935).
 Ki-10-I (Army Fighter Type 95-I): Initial production version (300 built December 1935 - October 1937)
 Ki-10-II : Prototype of modified Mark I, increased in length (1 built May 1936)
 Ki-10-II  (Army Fighter Type 95–2): Improved production version (280 built June 1937 - December 1938)
 Ki-10-I KAI : Prototype Ki-10-I with modifications to engine and radiator (1 built October 1936)
 Ki-10-II KAI : Prototype - Aerodynamic modification of Ki-10-II, now designated Ki-10-I-KAI, with  Kawasaki Ha9-IIb engine (2 built November 1937)

Total production: 588 units

Operators

 Imperial Japanese Army Air Force
 1st Rentai IJAAF
 4th Rentai IJAAF
 5th Rentai IJAAF
 6th Rentai IJAAF
 8th Rentai IJAAF
 11th Rentai IJAAF
 13th Rentai IJAAF
 4th Sentai IJAAF
 9th Sentai IJAAF
 33rd Sentai IJAAF
 59th Sentai IJAAF
 64th Sentai IJAAF
 77th Sentai IJAAF
 Akeno Fighter Training School

Specifications (Ki-10-II)

See also

References
Notes

Bibliography

External links

 Rickard, J (9 March 2010), Kawasaki Ki-10 'Perry'
 Kawasaki (Ki-10) Type 95 ‘Perry’ at surfcity.kund.dalnet.se
 Debut in the Chinese Sky, Fighter “Kawasaki” Ki-10 at j-aircraft.com

Single-engined tractor aircraft
Ki-10, Kawasaki
Ki-010
Aircraft first flown in 1935